Bread of Love is a 1953 Swedish drama film directed by Arne Mattsson. It was entered into the 1954 Cannes Film Festival.

Cast
 Folke Sundquist as Prisoner
 Georg Rydeberg as Ledin
 Nils Hallberg as Tom
 Lennart Lindberg as Narrator
 Erik Hell as Bouncer
 Yngve Nordwall as Vicar (as Yngve Nordvall)
 Sissi Kaiser as Lunnaja
 Dagny Lind as Bouncer's Mother

References

External links
 
 

1953 films
1950s Swedish-language films
1953 drama films
Swedish black-and-white films
Films directed by Arne Mattsson
Swedish drama films
1950s Swedish films